North Ice was a research station of the British North Greenland Expedition (1952 to 1954) on the inland ice of Greenland. The British North Greenland Expedition was led by Commander James Simpson RN. The name of the station contrasts to the former British South Ice station in Antarctica.

See also
List of research stations in the Arctic
Eismitte
Summit Camp
NEEM Camp

References

Research stations in Greenland
Arctic research